The Prêmio Jabuti (the "Tortoise Prize") is the most traditional literary award in Brazil, given by the Brazilian Book Chamber (CBL). It was conceived by Edgard Cavalheiro in 1959 when he presided over the CBL, with the interest of rewarding authors, editors, illustrators, graphics and booksellers who stood out each year.

In 1959, there were only seven categories: Literature, Cover, Illustration, Editor of the Year, Chart of the Year, Bookseller of the Year and Literary Personality. Subsequently, the award incorporated other categories involving the creation and production of books, such as Adaptation, Graphic Design and Translation. In addition to the traditional categories such as Romance, Tales and Chronicles, Poetry, Children's, Youth, Reportage and Biography. The "Fiction Book of the Year" and "Non-Fiction Book of the Year" categories were created in 1991 and 1993, respectively. The Jabuti Award began to include two new divisions in 2017: Comics and Brazilian Book Published Abroad.

In 2018, the Jabuti Award changed its format, with the then 29 categories being reduced to 18, distributed along four axes. In addition, it also changed the "Book of the Year" category (which until then awarded two books, one fiction and one nonfiction), starting to prize only one book, regardless of genre.

The Yearbook will be awarded to a single work, whether Fiction or Non-Fiction. The author will receive a special Tortoise trophy and a gross value of R$ 100,000.00 (one hundred thousand reais). The publisher of the work will receive a unique figurine (2019).

Since its first edition in 1959 many new categories have been added, and today it covers numerous literary and related categories:

Categories 
 Translation
 Architecture and Urban Studies, Photography, Communications and Arts
 Literary Criticism and Literary Theory
 Illustration for Children's Literature or Young Adult Literature
 Exact Sciences, Technology and Information Technology
 Education, Psychology and Psychoanalysis
 Journalism
 Pedagogy
 Economics, Business Administration, Business
 Law
 Biography
 Cover Art
 Poetry
 Social Sciences
 Natural Sciences and Health Sciences
 Short Stories and Chronicles
 Children's Literature
 Young Adult Literature
 Novels (Premio Jabuti - Literary Novel category)
 Comic Book

Partial selection of winners

1959 
 Jorge Amado, Novel
 Jorge Medauar, Stories / novels
 Associação dos Geógrafos Brasileiros (Seção São Paulo), Literary Studies (Essays)
 Mário da Silva Brito, Literary History
 Renato Sêneca Fleury, Children's Literature
 Isa Silveira Leal, Juvenile literature
 Carlos Bastos, Illustrations
 Aldemir Martins, Cover Artist

1960 
 Marques Rebelo, Novel / Fiction
 Dalton Trevisan, Stories / novels
 Sosigenes Costa, Poetry
 Paulo Cavalcanti, Literary Studies (Essays)
 Antonio Candido, Literary History
 Arnaldo Magalhães de Giacomo, Children's Literature
 Oswaldo Storni, Illustrations
 Eugênio Hirsch, Cover Artist

1961 
 Maria de Lourdes Teixeira, Novel / Fiction
 Clarice Lispector, Stories / novels
 Olímpio de Sousa Andrade, Literary Studies (Essays)
 Cassiano Ricardo, Poetry
 Otto Maria Carpeaux, Literary History
 Breno Silveira, Literary translations
 Francisco de Barros Júnior, Children's Literature
 Frank Schaeffer, Illustrations
 Clóvis Graciano, Cover Artist

1963 
 Marques Rebelo, Novel / Fiction
 Julieta de Godoy Ladeira, Stories / novels
 Mário Chamie, Poetry
 Mário Graciotti, Literary Studies (Essays)
 Jacob Penteado, Biography and memoir
 José Aderaldo Castelo, Literary History
 Jorge Mautner, Adult Literature (author revelation)
 Cecília Meireles, Literary translations
 Elos Sand, Children's Literature
 Vicente Di Grado, Cover Artist

1964 
 Francisco Marins, Novel / Fiction
 João Antônio, Stories / novels
 Herman Lima, Poetry
 Cecília Meireles, Poetry
 Otto Maria Carpeaux, Literary History
 João Antônio, Adult Literature (author revelation)
 Maria José Dupré, Children's Literature
 Florestan Fernandes, Human Sciences (except letters)
 Oswaldo Sangiorgi, Exact science - Mathematics
 Crodoaldo Pavan/Antônio Brito da Cunha/Maury Miranda, Natural Sciences - Genetics
 Percy Lau, Illustrations
 Ove Osterbye, Cover Artist

1970 
 Lupe Cotrim, Poetry

1979 
 Mário Donato, Novel / Fiction
 Sônia Coutinho, Stories / novels
 Leila Coelho Frota, Poetry
 Davi Arrigucci Júnior, Literary Studies (Essays)
 Cyro dos Anjos, Biography or memoir
 Augusto de Campos, Translation of literary work
 Joel Rufino dos Santos, Children's Literature
 Adofo Crippa, Human Sciences (except letters)
 Cláudio Lucchesi, Tomasz Kowaltowski, Janos Simon, Imre Simon and Istvan Simon, Exact sciences
 Mário Guimarães Ferri, Natural Sciences
 Maurício Prates de Campos Filho, Science (Technology)
 Eugênio Amado, Translation of scientific work
 Alceu Amoroso Lima, Literary person of the year

1983 
 Caio Fernando Abreu, Stories / novels

1996 
 Charles M. Culver, Best Medical book published in Brazil in 1995

1999 
 Carlos Nascimento Silva, Sônia Coutinho and Modesto Carone, Novel / Fiction
 Charles Kiefer, Rubens Figueiredo and João Inácio Padilha, Stories and chronicles
 Haroldo de Campos, Gerardo Melo Mourão and Salgado Maranhão, Poetry
 Editora Globo, Ivo Barroso and Victor Burton, Translation
 Ricardo Azevedo (duas publ) and Lourenço Cazarré, Children's / youth literature
 Eduardo Bueno, Hilário Franco Junior and Novais/Sevcenko/Schwarcz, Human Sciences
 Alfredo K. Oyama Homma, Pedro L. B. Lisboa and Lacaz/Porto/Vaccari/Melo, Natural Science and medicine
 Márcia Helena Mendes Ferraz, Herch Moysés Nussenzveig and Sônia Pitta Coelho/Francisco César Polcino Milies, Exact sciences, Technology and Computers
 Paul Singer, Josué Rios and Celso Furtado, Economics, Management, Business and Law
 Roger Mello, Demóstenes Vargas and Roberto Weigand, Illustration of children's or youth books

2011 
 Ferreira Gullar, Fiction book of the year and Poetry. 
 Dalton Trevisan, Stories / novels
 Marina Colasanti, Children's Literature
Note: Gilberto Freyre won a posthumous award.

External links
  Prêmio Jabuti website

References 

Brazilian literary awards
Awards established in 1958
Portuguese-language literary awards
1958 establishments in Brazil